SoftBrew is a coffee brewing device from Italy, created by the designer George Sowden in 2010. 

The device uses a simple infusion method for brewing coffee. A stainless steel filter, allowing any grind of coffee to be used, such as fine, medium or coarse.

SoftBrew 
SoftBrew is a method of coffee-making that is a very different process than espresso - where water is forced through the group head under pressure.

According to Chris White, Director at Altura Coffee Co. in New Zealand, “Soft brew makes it much easier to pick up on the distinct taste characteristics coffee. For example, it is hard to distinguish between the flavour characteristics of Kenyan and Guatemalan coffee in an espresso – but as soft brew you get a much better flavour range on your palatte and can really pick up on the nuances.”

Other types of SoftBrew devices are filter, Chemex and plunger.

How to SoftBrew Coffee using Sowden SoftBrew 
In order to brew coffee using the Sowden SoftBrew, coffee grounds are placed into the filter (which sits in a pot), water is poured over covering the grounds and left to brew for at least 4 minutes to overnight for a stronger cold brew.

The strength of the coffee can be adjusted by altering the amount of grounds that are initially placed in the filter.

The filter can be rinsed and reused indefinitely, making it more environmentally conscious.

Tea
The SoftBrew teapot uses a concept similar to SoftBrew coffee – a stainless steel filter to hold the tea leaves is an integral part of the product.

References

External links

Sowden SoftBrew Website

Coffee preparation